Lucy Jane Briers (born 19 August 1967) is an English actress. Her film, stage and television roles have included appearances in Pride & Prejudice (1995) and sitcom Game On.

Early life
Briers was born on 19 August 1967 in Hammersmith, London. She is the daughter of the actor Richard Briers and actress Ann Davies. She wanted to be an actress from an early age.

Briers attended St Paul's Girls' School, London (1978–85); Lancaster University (where she studied theatre and sculpture); and then a three-year acting course at the Bristol Old Vic Theatre School and she was a member of the National Youth Theatre. As well as acting, Briers plays both the piano and flute.

Career
Briers played Mary Bennet in the BBC's television adaptation of Pride & Prejudice (1995). She has narrated the documentary The Riddle of Pompeii, the 2001 series Nurses and Ladette to Lady.

In 2007, Briers appeared in Some Kind of Bliss, a one-woman play by Samuel Adamson at the Trafalgar Studios, a role she reprised in the 2008 Brits off Broadway season. She appeared in the BBC drama Einstein and Eddington (2008) and a West End revival of Chekhov's Ivanov. In 2011 she appeared in BBC Four's Twenty Twelve first as Anna Mitchell, one of the three candidates for the post of curator of the Cultural Olympiad, then with her face blurred as Laura, Ian Fletcher's wife. In 2017 she appeared in Father Brown "The tree of Truth" as Prudence Bovary and in 2020 in Jane Austen's Emma as Mrs Reynolds.

Filmography

Film

Television

Stage

Awards and nominations

References

External links
 

1967 births
Living people
20th-century English actresses
21st-century English actresses
Actresses from London
Alumni of Bristol Old Vic Theatre School
Alumni of Lancaster University
Alumni of Cartmel College, Lancaster
English film actresses
English Shakespearean actresses
English stage actresses
English television actresses
National Youth Theatre members
People educated at St Paul's Girls' School
People from Hammersmith